Jean Goodwin Ames (November 6, 1903 – February 12, 1986) was an American artist known for her work with the Works Progress Administration (WPA).

Biography
Ames née Goodwin was born on November 6, 1903, in Santa Ana, California. She studied at the Chouinard Art Institute, the School of the Art Institute of Chicago, Pomona College, and the University of California, Los Angeles. She received her masters degree from the University of Southern California. In 1941 she married fellow artist Arthur Forbes Ames. Before their marriage the couple collaborated on several WPA murals including the sketches for History of Aviation at the Charles Lindbergh Middle School in Long Beach, California, two mosaic murals Three Women Gathering at the Sea Shore at Harbor High School in  Newport Beach, California, and three egg tempera murals Recreation, Agriculture, and Conservation at the San Diego County Administration Center.

Ames taught at Scripps College and Claremont Graduate University. She died on February 12, 1986, in Claremont, California. In 1958 she was named a Los Angeles Times Woman of the Year.

Her work was included in the 2008 exhibition First Generation: Art in Claremont, 1907-1957 at the Claremont Museum of Art. Papers of Arthur and Jean Ames, including examples and photographs are in the Online Archive of California.

References

External links
image of Recreation, Agriculture, Conservation from the San Diego County Administration Center
images of Ames' enamels at The Enamel Arts Foundation
Oral history interview with Arthur and Jean Goodwin Ames, 1965 June 9 from the Archives of American Art, Smithsonian Institution

Further reading
Spirituality vital to Jean Goodwin Ames creative process from the Claremont Courier

1903 births
1986 deaths
Muralists
20th-century American women artists
Federal Art Project artists
Scripps College faculty